The Galway Warriors are an Irish American Football team formed in 2012, and located in Galway City.

Season by season records
Note: W = Wins, L = Losses, T = Ties

Individual awards

Galway Warriors MVP

Galway Warriors Offensive Player of the Year

Galway Warriors Defensive Player of the Year

Galway Warriors Special Teams Player of the Year

Galway Warriors Rookie Player of the Year

Galway Warriors Lineman of the year

Galway Warriors Most Improved Player

Galway Warriors Outstanding Contribution Award

Charity work
In 2013, the Galway Warriors took on The Galway Hospice as their principal charity.

References

American football teams in the Republic of Ireland
Sport in Galway (city)
American football teams established in 2012
2012 establishments in Ireland